John Calvert Hibbert (4 August 1853 – 23 March 1929) was an English first-class cricketer and banker.

The son of Leicester Hibbert, he was born in August 1853 at Chalfont St Peter, Buckinghamshire. He studied at the Royal Agricultural College at Cirencester, but became a banker. He played first-class cricket for the Marylebone Cricket Club making two appearances against Hampshire in 1881 and Somerset in 1882. He struggled as a batsman, being dismissed for a duck in all three of his innings' in first-class cricket. Hibbert died in Southern France at Saint-Raphaël while staying with relatives in March 1929. His uncle, Charles Calvert, was also a first-class cricketer.

References

External links

1853 births
1929 deaths
People from Chalfont St Peter
Alumni of the Royal Agricultural University
English bankers
English cricketers
Marylebone Cricket Club cricketers